Persicaria filiformis is a species of flowering plant in the family Polygonaceae, native to the Kuril Islands, Japan (including the Ryukyu Islands), Korea, Myanmar, the Philippines and Vietnam. It was first described as Polygonum filiforme in 1784 by Carl Thunberg and transferred to the genus Persicaria in 1819 by Takenoshin Nakai. The species has been treated as the variety filiformis of Persicaria virginiana, a North American species.

References

filiformis
Flora of the Kuril Islands
Flora of Japan
Flora of the Ryukyu Islands
Flora of Korea
Flora of Myanmar
Flora of the Philippines
Flora of Vietnam
Plants described in 1784